The Damal or Damalme are a group of people living in the highlands of the Central Papua province of Indonesia. They primarily live in Beoga Valley along the river of Beogong. The Damal people are closely related to the Delem people, and with the Amungme people living in the southern lowland region. Delem is an ethnic group reportedly descended from the Damal people, Dani people, and Wonno people.

According to oral history, Damal people came from a place called Mepingama in Baliem Valley, and then Kurima where they gather, and Hitigima the place where they started creating Honai houses with thatched roof. From Kurima the ancestors of many papuan tribes including Damal travel west, settled in Ilop which now are called Beoga and Ilaga. From their heartland in Beoga and Ilaga, some Damal moved to Jila, Alama, Bella, Stinga, Hoeya, Tembagapura (Kampung Waa), Aroanop, Timika, and Agimuga.

Social structure 

The Damal have a system of exogamous moieties, which split the society to 'Magaij' and 'Mom'. These split social groups have equal standing politically and are only for marriage. People from the same social group cannot marry each other and have to marry the people from the other social group. Each moiety is made up of patrilienal clans (same family name), with 37 clans in Beoga district and another 8 clans in Ilaga district. Each clans are made up of smaller patrilineal groups which will help each other in supplying for travel, pay dowries, and other expenses. 

Politically, Damal are led by Nagawan/Nagwan, which is not limited to certain groups or inherited positions. However, they have responsibilities to be good with finances such as operating plantations, pig farms, bia (shell) trade to pay for dowry and compensations for loss in tribal wars. They are expected to be alapme (charitable) and organise festivals for the people as well as have good oratory skills and brave to lead war.

References

Ethnic groups in Indonesia